Acropteryx is a genus of darkling beetles in the family Tenebrionidae. They are found in the Neotropics.

References

Tenebrioninae